German Hearts on the German Rhine is a 1926 German silent film directed by Fred Sauer and starring Gyula Szőreghy, Frieda Lehndorf, and Hans Albers.

The film's sets were designed by Willi Herrmann.

Cast

References

Bibliography

External links

1926 films
Films of the Weimar Republic
German silent feature films
Films directed by Fred Sauer
German black-and-white films
Films set in Germany